There were three NASCAR national series in 2010:

National series
2010 NASCAR Sprint Cup Series – The top racing series in NASCAR
2010 NASCAR Nationwide Series – The second-highest racing series in NASCAR
2010 NASCAR Camping World Truck Series – The third-highest racing series in NASCAR

Regional series
2010 NASCAR Canadian Tire Series – Canadian regional series
2010 NASCAR Corona Series – Premiere NASCAR Mexico series
2010 NASCAR Mini Stock Series –Secondary NASCAR Mexico series

 
NASCAR seasons